High Gate is an unincorporated community in eastern Maries County, Missouri, United States. It is at the intersection of routes H and U approximately fourteen miles east of Vienna and 1.5 miles from the Maries-Gasconade county line.

A post office called High Gate was established in 1877, and remained in operation until 1971. The community was named after Highgate, London, the native home of an early settler.

References

Unincorporated communities in Maries County, Missouri
Unincorporated communities in Missouri